Dhurjati (దూర్జటి ) (c. 15th and 16th centuries, CE) was a Telugu poet in the court of the king Krishnadevaraya and was one of the astadiggajalu (Translated "Eight Mighty Elephants ") there.

Biography
He was born to Singamma and Narayana in Sri Kalahasti and was the grandson of Jakkayya. He was a great devotee of lord Shiva, also known as Kalahasteeshwara. He referred to his birthplace as part of Pottapi Nadu, named after an earlier Chola kingdom based from Pottapi in Cuddapah in his works.

Works
His works are to the praise of the God Shiva. His famous works include  Sri Kalahasteeshwara Mahatyam (The grace/miracles of lord Shiva) and Sri Kalahasteeshwara Satakam (100+ poems in the praise of lord Shiva).

He was known as Pedda Dhurjati (Elder in Telugu) as there were four other people from the same family line who went by the name of Dhurjati during the same period and after him. His grandson Venkataraya Dhurjati wrote Indumati Parinayam (marriage of Indumati), a story from Kalidasa's Raghuvamsa.

He is also credited with many chatuvus, stand-alone extempore poems.

Style
Like other contemporaries during Prabandha period, he has taken themes from Puranas and added local stories and myths in his work. Unlike his contemporaries like Peddana and Mallana, who have chosen the stories of kings for their works, he choose devotion as the theme of his fiction.

Krishnadevaraya has praised Dhurjati in the following way "Stutimati yaina Andhrakavi Dhurjati palkulakelagalgeno yetulita madhuri mahima...." (How is Dhurjati's poetry so immeasurably beautiful).

References
 Dhurjati
 Sri Kalhasteeswara Sathakam PDF Download
 K.A. Nilakanta Sastry, History of South India, From Prehistoric times to fall of Vijayanagar, 1955, OUP, New Delhi (Reprinted 2002) 
 Golden age of Telugu Literature
 Literary activity in Vijayanagara Empire
 Sree Kaalahasti Maahaathyamu, Mahaakavi Dhoorjati, EMESCO BOOKS- Sampradaaya Saahiti - A low price edition, with Viswanatha Satyanarayana's introduction, 2006.

Notes

Telugu poets
Telugu people
People of the Vijayanagara Empire
Hindu poets
16th-century Indian poets
15th-century Indian poets
Indian male poets
People from Chittoor district
Poets from Andhra Pradesh
Vijayanagara poets